Calisen is a British energy company based in Manchester which provides energy meters and meter reading services. It was listed on the London Stock Exchange in February 2020 but acquired by a consortium of private equity funds in March 2021.

History
The company, which was established as Calvin Capital in 2002, received financial backing from Infracapital in 2007. After being acquired by Kohlberg Kravis Roberts in June 2016, it bought Wigan-based meter installer Lowri Beck in April 2019. It was the subject of an initial public offering on the London Stock Exchange in January 2020. In December 2020 the board of the company agreed to recommend to shareholders a takeover offer by a consortium of private equity funds consisting of the Global Energy & Power Infrastructure Fund III, Nineteenth Investment Company and various funds managed by Goldman Sachs. The transaction was completed in March 2021.

Operations
The company provides, owns and manages energy meters through Calvin Capital and offers meter reading services through Lowri Beck.

References

External links
Official site
Companies formerly listed on the London Stock Exchange
2002 establishments in England
Companies based in Manchester